Carl Martin Doar (born 5 July 1983) is a former English cricketer.  Doar is a right-handed batsman who bowls right-arm medium pace.  He was born at Derby, Derbyshire.

Doar represented the Derbyshire Cricket Board in 2 List A cricket matches.  These came against Cambridgeshire in the 2001 Cheltenham & Gloucester Trophy and Bedfordshire in the 1st round of the 2002 Cheltenham & Gloucester Trophy which was held in 2002.  In his 2 List A matches, he took a single wicket at a bowling average of 59.00, with best figures of 1/44.

References

External links
Carl Doar at Cricinfo
Carl Doar at CricketArchive

1983 births
Living people
Cricketers from Derby
English cricketers
Derbyshire Cricket Board cricketers